Brian Blair "Killer" Kilrea (born October 21, 1934) is a Canadian former ice hockey head coach, general manager, and player. He played 26 games in the National Hockey League with the Detroit Red Wings and Los Angeles Kings between 1958 and 1967, with the rest of his playing career, which lasted from 1955 to 1970, spent in American Hockey League. Kilrea then became a coach, and coached and managed the Ottawa 67's of the Ontario Hockey League for 32 seasons between 1974 and 2015, after which he continued on as general manager. He is a member of the Hockey Hall of Fame in the Builders category.

Playing career
Kilrea played his first major junior season with the Hamilton Tiger Cubs in 1954–55. In his playing career he played only 26 NHL games, although he had great success in the minor leagues. Kilrea spent four seasons with the Troy Bruins of the IHL, where he was named a second team All-Star in 1958–1959. Most of Kilrea's career was spent with the AHL's Springfield Indians, where he was a multiple All-Star and the franchise's career leader in assists. He has been named to the Springfield Hockey Hall of Fame. Kilrea played under Eddie Shore and credits Shore with teaching him many things that he took into his coaching career.

Kilrea returned to the NHL briefly, with expansion in 1967. Kilrea has the distinction of scoring the first-ever goal for the NHL Los Angeles Kings. It was during his time with the team's AHL franchise that the roots for what would become the National Hockey League Players Association would arise, as a direct result of the efforts of Kilrea and Alan Eagleson, then the agent for Bobby Orr.

Coaching career
After ending his playing career, Kilrea started coaching minor hockey in Ottawa. He first made a name for himself when his Ottawa West Midget AA team defeated a touring Soviet squad, the only loss by the Soviets on their tour. This caught the attention of the owners of the OHL major junior Ottawa 67's and they soon offered him a coaching job, replacing Leo Boivin at the start of the 1974–75 season. He would continue coaching the 67's until 1984, when he became an assistant coach with the defending Stanley Cup champions, New York Islanders of the NHL. However, after two seasons, he would return to coaching the 67's. Head coach of the Sarnia Sting, Dave McQueen played for Kilrea and says that Kilrea had his players over to his house at Christmas but when you were in his 'dog house' it was often tough to get out.

Except for a brief retirement for the 1994–95 season, Kilrea coached the 67's until the end of the 2008–09 season, and was also the General Manager of the club. He won the Memorial Cup, emblematic of Canada's major junior championship, twice with the 67's (1984 and 1999) and is the winningest coach in junior hockey history – a task completed on January 17, 1997 with his 742nd win. On February 2, 2007, Brian Kilrea coached his 2000th game as head coach of the 67's.

Kilrea also won the Matt Leyden Trophy as OHL Coach of the Year in 1980–81, 1981–82, 1995–96, 1996–97 and 2002–03. Kilrea was also honoured with the Bill Long Award in 1994, for distinguished service to the OHL.

In 2003, Brian Kilrea was inducted into the Hockey Hall of Fame in the Builders category. The Brian Kilrea Coach of the Year Award, given annually to the top coach in the Canadian Hockey League, was renamed in his honour shortly after his induction into the Hockey Hall of Fame. Kilrea won the award in 1996–97 when it was known as the CHL Coach of the Year Award.

In twenty-nine seasons with the 67's he has only had six losing seasons – an extraordinary task in junior hockey, which due to age restrictions has a high turnover rate of players.

On September 3, 2008, Kilrea announced that 2008–09 would be his final season as coach of the 67's, though he plans to continue serving as general manager of the club.

On March 15, 2009, Ottawa beat the Kingston Frontenacs 5–3 to give Kilrea a win in his final regular season game, giving him 1,193 wins all-time.

Kilera returned behind the bench on October 17, 2014 for the Ottawa 67's to celebrate his 80th birthday. He became the oldest coach in hockey history, winning career game number 1,194 by a score of 6-3 against the Mississauga Steelheads.

Kilrea served as a recurring assistant coach to Don Cherry in the CHL/NHL Top Prospects Game.

Personal life
Kilrea is a nephew of former NHL players Wally, Ken, and Hec Kilrea.

Since 1976, Kilrea has co-owned a restaurant with Nick Bouris called Chances R in Ottawa's west end. He is an honorary member of the Rideau View Country Club, a golf club located in Manotick, Ontario.

Kilrea had a heart attack on August 12, 2012, and subsequently underwent triple bypass surgery.

Career statistics

Regular season and playoffs

Coaching record

References

External links
 
 

1934 births
Living people
Canadian ice hockey centres
Canadian ice hockey coaches
Detroit Red Wings players
Edmonton Flyers (WHL) players
Hamilton Tiger Cubs players
Hockey Hall of Fame inductees
Ice hockey people from Ottawa
Lisgar Collegiate Institute alumni
Los Angeles Kings players
National Hockey League assistant coaches
New York Islanders coaches
Ottawa 67's coaches
Rochester Americans players
Springfield Indians players
Vancouver Canucks (WHL) players